Luís Airton Barroso "Lulù" de Oliveira (born 24 March 1969) is a football manager and former player. A striker, he spent most of his playing career in Italy. Born in Brazil, Oliveira was an international footballer for Belgium.

Playing career

Club
Born in 1969 in a favela in São Luís, Maranhão, Brazil, he was signed by Belgian club Anderlecht, where he started his career and played until 1992.

He moved to Italy in 1992, where he played for Cagliari, Fiorentina, Bologna, Como, Catania, Foggia, Venezia and Lucchese, becoming famous in his early years at Cagliari and Fiorentina as a prolific and effective Serie A striker.

In 2006, he accepted to play Nuorese of Serie C2/A, also in order to get closer to his family (his wife in Sardinia). In 2008, following the disbandment of his club, he agreed for a move to Serie D team Derthona.

In July 2009, Oliveira moved back to Sardinia, joining Eccellenza club Muravera, a club from his wife's hometown. He retired in 2010 at the age of 41.

International
A naturalized Belgian citizen, he earned 31 caps for Belgium and played for his adoptive country at the 1998 FIFA World Cup.

Coaching career
During his final season as a footballer, Oliveira also served as player/manager for the last few months of the 2009–10 season, and then stated his interest in a coaching career in the next future.

He successfully passed the category 2 (UEFA A) coaching exam in June 2011 in Italy. In March 2012 he returned to Muravera, this time as head coach for the remaining four games of the season. He was confirmed as Muravera coach also for the 2012–13 season, in which he led his small club to triumph in the Coppa Italia Eccellenza.

On 1 August 2014, it was announced Oliveira would become the new head coach of Lega Pro club Pro Patria with immediate effect, but he was dismissed on 4 November 2014 after managing just one win in 11 matches.

On 13 June 2015, Oliveira was appointed as new head coach of Maltese Premier club Floriana, however his tenure lasted less than two months and was replaced by Guido Ugolotti.

Career statistics

Club

International goals

Honours
Anderlecht
Belgian First Division: 1990–91
Belgian Cup: 1988–89, 1989–90
European Cup Winners' Cup: 1989–90 (runners-up)
Bruges Matins: 1988

Fiorentina
Supercoppa Italiana: 1996

Como
Serie B: 2001–02

Individual 

Man of the Season (Belgian First Division): 1990–91

References

1969 births
Living people
People from São Luís, Maranhão
Belgian people of Brazilian descent
Association football forwards
Belgian footballers
Brazilian footballers
Belgian football managers
Belgian expatriate footballers
Belgium international footballers
Belgian Pro League players
Naturalised citizens of Belgium
Brazilian emigrants to Belgium
Serie A players
Serie B players
Serie C players
Serie D players
R.S.C. Anderlecht players
Cagliari Calcio players
ACF Fiorentina players
Bologna F.C. 1909 players
Como 1907 players
Catania S.S.D. players
Calcio Foggia 1920 players
Venezia F.C. players
S.S.D. Lucchese 1905 players
1998 FIFA World Cup players
Expatriate footballers in Italy
A.S.D. HSL Derthona players
Nuorese Calcio players
Floriana F.C. managers
Maltese Premier League managers
Sportspeople from Maranhão